Chris James is an American audio engineer who has worked as a recording engineer and/or mixing engineer for several musical artists including Kings of Leon, Luther Vandross and most famously alongside Prince with whom he was nominated at the 59th Grammy Awards in the Best Engineered Album, Non-Classical category for Prince's final studio project, Hit n Run Phase Two. He currently resides in the Los Angeles, California area.

See also 
 List of people from Memphis, Tennessee
 List of Middle Tennessee State University people

References

External links
 
 Audio from 2017 Recording Studio Rockstars Interview 

1974 births
Living people
African-American record producers
African-American songwriters
Record producers from Tennessee
American audio engineers
People from Murfreesboro, Tennessee
21st-century African-American people
20th-century African-American people